Hunza, Pakistan, has been famous for its practices in Shamanism. Shaman in the local language (Burushaski) are referred as 'Bitan'. Shamanism in the area has been linked to its dynamic history.

Bitan 
Bitan is the Burushaski equivalent of Shaman. Bitans are not like the Eurasian Shamans, as the Eurasian Shamans have some special physical qualities like extra teeth, a sixth finger, or other physical signs. Dayals are normal beings who are selected by the Pari (the fairy, plural ).

Pariting descends to the earth during the cherry and apricot blossom seasons. Pariting choose the dayal from new borns by smelling their noses and mouths. It is not apparent who is a dayal during the childhood. Bitans grow distinct characteristics when they reach teenage. These characteristics includes becoming unconscious, going into a state of ecstasy, or sickness for days or sometimes weeks. A Bitan may die if he (his spirit) resists to be one during the period when the shamanist's characteristics start to appear.

Dayal have craving for music (a special tune/composition); on listening to such music they can go into a state of trance where they meet with the pari. Bitans dance to the music during festivals like Ginani (crop harvesting festival). During the dance, dayal also foretell the next year's crop production.

Shamanic Practices 
Shamans or the Dayals are believed to have foresight. This foresight is a result of Dayal's interactions with the spirits. These spirits are fairies, pari (plural ) as called in the local language. The paris tell the dayals about the future when they are in an ecstatic/trance state. Thus they foretell the future.

The Ritual 
The ritual to get the dayal into the shamanistic or the ecstatic state, need music, smoke and blood of goat. Music is played by the musicians. The orchestra has three instruments, namely Dadang (Drum), Daamal (two hemi-spherical drums) and Surnai (Shenai) or Gabi (local variant of reed pipe). For the smoke juniper leaves and Syrian rue (local name Supandur) are put on fire. For blood the dayal drinks it from the recently chopped head of a goat (Chati).

Dayal starts to dance to the music. While dancing dayal inhales the smoke of juniper leaves simultaneously. Then drinking the blood from Chati. Dayal gets into a higher state as he continues to dance to the music. Reaching the state the dayal starts to speak in Shina (language of Gilgit). Dayal converses/argues/ask the pari regarding the concern he has. During the process dayal may pass out. Dayal can go to such state for at most two or three times before he passes out.

History 
Historians like M.H. Sidky, have done extensive research on the topic of Shamanism. Sidky had published a paper on Shamanism in Hunza. Where the author had mentioned the famous Bitans (shamans) of the area, including Huk Mamu and Shon Gakur.

Bitans of Hunza used to tell future by doing the shamanic practices. Bitans were summoned by the Thum/Mir to predict any calamity, famine or any disaster expected in near future.

References 

Hunza
Religion in Pakistan
Shamanism